The 2019 Ōita gubernatorial election was held on 7 April 2019 to elect the next governor of Ōita.

Candidates 
Katsusada Hirose back by national LDP and Komeito.
Kai Yamashita for the JCP.
Yoshiko Shutō.

Results

References 

2019 elections in Japan
Gubernatorial elections in Japan
April 2019 events in Japan
Politics of Ōita Prefecture